Cristian Vasc (born 8 January 1969) is a retired Romanian football midfielder.

Honours
FC Universitatea Craiova
Cupa României: 1992–93
FC Brașov
Liga II: 1998–99

References

1969 births
Living people
Romanian footballers
Liga I players
Liga II players
CS Minaur Baia Mare (football) players
CS Universitatea Craiova players
FC Brașov (1936) players
FC Progresul București players
CS Inter Gaz București players
Association football midfielders